Leszek Ryszard Iwanicki (born 12 August 1959) is a Polish former footballer who played at midfielder for Widzew Łódź mostly.

His previous clubs were Piast Gliwice, Zawisza Rzgów, Marko Walichnowy, RKS Radomsko, Polonia Bytom, Widzew Łódź, Motor Lublin, Legia Warsaw, and Urania Geneva in Switzerland, SK Vorwärts Steyr in Austria, La Roche VF in France, Umeå FC in Sweden, and Yukong Elephants in South Korea.

He was first Polish player of K League with Tadeusz Świątek

References

External links
 

1959 births
Living people
Association football midfielders
Polish footballers
Legia Warsaw players
Motor Lublin players
Widzew Łódź players
Jeju United FC players
Polonia Bytom players
Piast Gliwice players
La Roche VF players
Umeå FC players
K League 1 players
Urania Genève Sport players
RKS Radomsko players
Ekstraklasa players
Expatriate footballers in South Korea
Expatriate footballers in France
Expatriate footballers in Sweden
Expatriate footballers in Switzerland
Polish expatriate footballers
Footballers from Warsaw
Poland international footballers